The 2022 Missouri Valley Conference men's basketball tournament, popularly referred to as "Arch Madness", was a postseason men's basketball tournament that completed the 2021–22 season in the Missouri Valley Conference. The tournament was held at the Enterprise Center in St. Louis, Missouri, during March 3–6, 2022. The winner, the  Loyola Ramblers, received the conference's automatic bid to the 2022 NCAA tournament.

Seeds
Teams were seeded by conference record, with ties broken by the overall record in conference games played between the tied teams, then (if necessary) by comparison of records between the tying institutions versus the top team in the standings (and continuing from top to bottom of standings, as necessary, with the team having the better record against that team receiving the better seed). The top six seeds received openinground byes.

Schedule

Bracket

References

Missouri Valley Conference men's basketball tournament
Basketball competitions in St. Louis
Tournament
College sports tournaments in Missouri
Missouri Valley Conference men's basketball tournament